Tandoori masala or tandoori sauce is a mixture of spices specifically for use with a tandoor, or clay oven, in traditional cooking in the Indian subcontinent. The specific spices vary somewhat from one region to another but typically include: garam masala, garlic, ginger, onion, cayenne pepper, and sometimes other spices and additives. The spices are often ground together with a pestle and mortar.

Origin 
Kundan Lal Gujral revolutionized tandoori cooking, and the creation of the tandoori masala spice blend is attributed to him. Like many spices, there is also the influence of a colonial legacy present within the rise of tandoori masala as Kundan Lal was a Hindu Punjabi-Pathan living in West Pakistan who ended up moving to Delhi, India in a time where communal violence rose after the Partition of India in 1947. While working in a restaurant in Peshawar in the 1920s, Kundan Lal experimented with the tandoor that was traditionally used for baking naan. In a stroke of genius, he was the first to cook chicken in the tandoor, and the spice blend he made and used for cooking the chicken in this manner became known as tandoori masala. In Delhi, Kundan Lal opened a restaurant called Moti Mahal, which is where dishes he created using tandoori masala reached national fame with politicians such as Jawaharlal Nehru favoring the taste and global fame as the restaurant became a global chain. Indian restaurants around the world pay homage to tandoori masala in their menus as tandoori chicken and butter chicken are highly popular staple features.

Usage and Storage 
Tandoori masala is used extensively with dishes such as tandoori chicken. In this dish, the chicken is covered with a mixture of plain yogurt and tandoori masala. The chicken is then roasted in the tandoor on high heat; when prepared in this fashion the chicken has a pink-colored exterior and a savory flavor.

Other chicken dishes, in addition to tandoori chicken, use this masala, such as tikka or butter chicken, most of them Punjabi dishes. Meat other than chicken can be used, as can paneer (paneer tikka).

If freshly prepared, the masala can be stored in airtight jars for up to two months. The spice blend is also readily available at larger supermarkets and specialty Asian stores, with varying tastes depending on the brand.

References

External links

 Authentic Indian Tandoor Chicken
 About.com - Indian Food: Tandoori Masala

North Indian cuisine
Pakistani cuisine
Indo-Caribbean cuisine
Indian spices
Masalas